EPCOT Magazine was an American newsmagazine television program that aired on The Disney Channel, premiering on the channel's first day of programming on April 18, 1983.

Format
Originating from EPCOT Center in Florida, host Michael Young, along with a different celebrity co-host, would present segments on focusing on topical news and entertainment, with subjects ranging from art, food, fashion, and travel. In 1984, a special two-part episode featured a visit to the Walt Disney Archives.

The series ran for an hour on weekday afternoons, with a half-hour evening edition and a full-hour weekend edition presenting recaps of the week's stories.

See also

References

External links

EPCOT Magazine intro 

1983 American television series debuts
1986 American television series endings
Television series by Disney
Disney Channel original programming
Epcot